United States gubernatorial elections were held on November 3, 2020, in 11 states and two territories. The previous gubernatorial elections for this group of states took place in 2016, except in New Hampshire and Vermont where governors only serve two-year terms. These two states elected their current governors in 2018. Nine state governors ran for reelection and all nine won, while Democrat Steve Bullock of Montana could not run again due to term limits and Republican Gary Herbert of Utah decided to retire at the end of his term.

In addition to state gubernatorial elections, the territories of American Samoa and Puerto Rico also held elections for their governors. Puerto Rican governor Wanda Vázquez Garced lost the New Progressive primary to Pedro Pierluisi, while Lolo Matalasi Moliga of American Samoa could not run again due to term limits.

The elections took place concurrently with the 2020 presidential election, elections to the House of Representatives and Senate, and numerous state and local elections. This round of gubernatorial elections marked the first time since West Virginia Governor Jim Justice's party switch in mid-2017 that Republicans flipped any governorships held previously by Democrats, and the first round of gubernatorial elections since 2016 where Republicans made net gains, ending a streak of Democratic net gains that had occurred in prior elections during the presidency of Republican Donald Trump.

Election predictions 
Several sites and individuals published predictions of competitive seats. These predictions looked at factors such as the strength of the incumbent (if the incumbent is running for re-election), the strength of the candidates, and the partisan leanings of the state (reflected in part by the state's Cook Partisan Voting Index rating). The predictions assigned ratings to each seat, with the rating indicating the predicted advantage that a party has in winning that seat.

Most election predictors use:
 "tossup": no advantage
 "tilt" (used by some predictors): advantage that is not quite as strong as "lean"
 "lean": slight advantage
 "likely": significant, but surmountable, advantage 
 "safe": near-certain chance of victory

Montana was considered the most competitive race in this cycle and was rated a tossup by four of six major pundits. Incumbent Democratic governor Steve Bullock was term-limited, but his lieutenant governor, Mike Cooney, a longtime political figure in the state since 1977, was the Democratic nominee. The Republican nominee was Montana at-large congressman Greg Gianforte, who is a controversial figure because he was arrested for body-slamming a reporter the day of a 2017 special election. Gianforte also isn't from Montana. The Bullock administration had an approval rating of 52% and a disapproval of 31%, according to a poll by the Morning Consult, meaning Cooney's election chances were higher in the otherwise solidly Republican state. North Carolina was the next most competitive race, as it is a Republican-leaning swing state with a Democratic governor, Roy Cooper, meaning that Cooper faced a tough reelection. Cooper won his 2016 election by a mere 10,277 votes, or 0.22%. However, most forecasters gave the race a Democratic lean as Cooper had an approval rating of 59%. Cooper had also lead most polls against his Republican challenger, Dan Forest, by an average of a 11-point lead, according to RealClearPolitics.

Vermont and New Hampshire are both races that could have become competitive as they are Democratic states with Republican governors in a presidential year. However, Republican incumbents Phil Scott of Vermont and Chris Sununu of New Hampshire are ranked among the most popular governors in the United States, and both races were rated likely to be safe Republican. Both are viewed as centrists who attract Democratic and independent voters. Scott's challenger was David Zuckerman, the state's lieutenant governor, who ran on both the Democratic and Progressive nominations. Zuckerman had been endorsed by Vermont U.S. Senator Bernie Sanders. Sununu was running against New Hampshire Senate Majority Leader Dan Feltes.

In Missouri, Republican incumbent Mike Parson assumed office after the resignation of Eric Greitens due to sexual harassment and violations of campaign finance laws, and his lack of name recognition and unpopularity could have made his race against state auditor Nicole Galloway, Missouri's only Democratic statewide office holder, competitive, though most forecasters still rated the race as lean Republican due to Missouri's heavy Republican lean. West Virginia’s gubernatorial race was seen as safe for Republicans because the state heavily leans Republican, but some forecasts rated it as likely Republican due to corruption allegations against incumbent Jim Justice that have led to rising unpopularity. Justice faced centrist Democrat Ben Salango, who was endorsed by U.S. Senator Joe Manchin and multiple local unions.

The gubernatorial races for John Carney in Delaware and Jay Inslee in Washington were seen as safe for Democrats, while the races for Eric Holcomb in Indiana, Doug Burgum in North Dakota, and Spencer Cox in Utah were seen as safe for Republicans.

Statistics

Closest races 
States where the margin of victory was between 1% and 5%:
 Puerto Rico, 1.37%
 North Carolina, 4.51%

Red denotes races won by Republicans. Blue denotes races won by Democrats. Dark blue denotes race won by New Progressives.

Partisan control of states 

All of the states that held gubernatorial elections in 2020 also held state legislative elections in 2020, although some legislative seats were not up for election in states that stagger legislative elections.

Summary

States

Territories

Election dates
These were the election dates for the regularly scheduled general elections.

Delaware

One-term incumbent Democrat John Carney ran for re-election to a second term. Primaries took place on September 15. Carney decisively defeated progressive community activist and environmentalist David Lamar Williams, Jr. in the Democratic primary.  Multiple candidates ran in the Republican primary, including attorney Julianne Murray, Delaware State Senator from the 16th district Colin Bonini, small business owner David Bosco, local Republican politician David Graham, Delaware State Senator from the 21st district Bryant Richardson, and perennial candidate Scott Walker. Murray narrowly defeated Bonini with a plurality of the vote. Carney won reelection by a large margin.

Indiana

One-term incumbent Republican Eric Holcomb ran for re-election in 2020 alongside his running mate Suzanne Crouch. Holcomb ran against the Democratic nominee, former Health Commissioner of Indiana Woody Myers, and his running mate Linda Lawson, the former Minority Leader of the Indiana House of Representatives. Donald Rainwater, a U.S. Navy veteran, was the Libertarian nominee. Primaries were held on June 2, although both Holcomb and Myers ran uncontested. Holcomb won the election in a landslide, though Libertarian Donald Rainwater's 11% of the vote was the highest percentage of vote for a third-party candidate in any of the 2020 gubernatorial race, and the highest any Libertarian candidate ever received in Indiana in a three-party race (The 2006 United States Senate election in Indiana saw the Libertarian candidate take 12.6% of the vote, but there was no Democratic candidate running).

Missouri 

One-term incumbent Republican Mike Parson took office upon Eric Greitens' resignation due to threatening the dissemination of sexual images and campaign finance violations. Parson ran for election to a full term in 2020 and easily won the Republican primary. State auditor Nicole Galloway, Missouri's only Democratic statewide office holder, won the Democratic primary, defeating pastor Eric Morrison, and multiple other candidates including Jimmie Matthews, Antoin Johnson, and Robin Quaethem. Primaries took place on August 4. The Libertarian nominee was U.S. Air Force veteran Rik Combs, while Jerome Bauer was the Green Party nominee. Both candidates ran uncontested in their respective primaries. Despite predictions that this election could be close and that Parson could underperform national Republicans in the state, Parson won handily.

Montana

Two-term incumbent Democrat Steve Bullock was term-limited in 2020, making him the only incumbent governor in the United States (not counting U.S. territories) who was term-limited in this election year. This was therefore an open-seat election, and viewed as the most competitive gubernatorial election in the 2020 cycle. Primaries were held on June 2, with heavy competition in both. Bullock's lieutenant governor, Mike Cooney, a longtime local politician, was the Democratic nominee, defeating businesswoman and daughter of former U.S. representative Pat Williams, Whitney Williams, in the Democratic primary. Cooney's running mate was Minority Leader of the Montana House of Representatives, Casey Schreiner. The Republican nominee was Montana's at-large congressman Greg Gianforte, who defeated Attorney General Tim Fox and State Senator from the 6th district, Albert Olszewski. Gianforte's running mate was Kristen Juras, a businesswoman and attorney. Gianforte was a controversial figure in the state, as he was arrested for body slamming a reporter the day of a 2017 special election. Despite predictions that this election would be close, Gianforte won by 12 points, making this the first time Montana has voted for a Republican for governor since 2000. This was the only gubernatorial seat to change parties in 2020.

New Hampshire

New Hampshire is one of two states, alongside Vermont, that has two-year terms for their governors instead of four-year terms, meaning they held their gubernatorial latest elections in 2018.  In December 2019, two-term incumbent Republican Chris Sununu announced that he would run for a third two-year term in 2020, ending speculation he would choose to run for the U.S. Senate instead. Sununu easily defeated Franklin city counselor Karen Testerman in the Republican primary. In a hotly contested Democratic primary, Majority Leader of the New Hampshire Senate Dan Feltes narrowly defeated Andru Volinsky, a member of the Executive Council of New Hampshire from the 2nd district. The primaries took place on September 8. Despite national Democrats winning by large margins in the state's presidential, senate, and house races, Sununu won by a large margin based on his popularity with voters of both parties.

North Carolina

One-term incumbent Democrat Roy Cooper, who won his 2016 election by an extremely slim margin of only 10,281 votes, ran for re-election in 2020. Lieutenant Governor Dan Forest was the Republican nominee. Primaries were held on March 3, where Cooper defeated retired U.S. Army captain and perennial candidate Ernest T. Reeves in a landslide in the Democratic primary, and Forest decisively defeated the North Carolina State Representative from the 20th district, Holly Grange, in the Republican primary. Cooper won reelection as pundits predicted, though the margin was close. Cooper outperformed national Democrats in the state, who narrowly lost both the Presidential and Senate races.

North Dakota 

One-term incumbent Republican Doug Burgum ran for re-election in 2020. Brent Sanford, the incumbent lieutenant governor, remained his running mate. The Democratic nominee was veterinarian and former Killdeer school board member Shelly Lenz, whose running mate was Ben Vig, a former member of the North Dakota House of Representatives from the 23rd district. Primaries were held on June 9, with Burgum winning by a landslide margin over U.S. Air Force veteran Michael Coachman and Lenz running uncontested. Burgum won reelection in a landslide.

Utah

Two and a half-term incumbent Republican Gary Herbert was eligible for re-election in 2020, as Utah does not have gubernatorial term limits. However, he announced shortly after being re-elected in 2016 that he would not run for a third full term. Lieutenant Governor Spencer Cox defeated multiple other high-profile Republicans in the competitive Republican primary on June 30 including former governor Jon Huntsman Jr., Speaker of the Utah House of Representatives Greg Hughes, and former Chairman of the Utah Republican Party Thomas Wright. Cox's running mate for Lieutenant Governor was Utah Senator from the 7th district, Deidre Henderson. Meanwhile, University of Utah law professor Christopher Peterson won an overwhelming majority of delegates at the Utah Democratic Convention, immediately awarding him with the Democratic nomination alongside his running mate, community organizer Karina Brown. During the general election campaign, an advertisement featuring Cox and Peterson together calling for unity went viral. Cox won in a landslide, outperforming national Republicans in the state.

Vermont

Two-term incumbent Republican Phil Scott confirmed he was seeking a third term in 2020. However, he did not campaign due to the COVID-19 pandemic, the handling of which awarded Scott with a 75% approval rating in the summer. Scott was re-elected with 55% of the vote in 2018. Scott is a heavy critic of President Donald Trump, who holds a net negative 39% disapproval rating in the Green Mountain State.  He is one of the last remaining liberal Republican politicians with center-left political leanings, and remains an outlier in the otherwise staunchly Democratic state. Primary elections were held on August 11. Scott defeated multiple challengers in the Republican primary, the most prominent of which was lawyer and pastor John Klar. Lieutenant Governor David Zuckerman defeated former education secretary Rebecca Holcombe in the Democratic primary. He also defeated Cris Ericson and Boots Wardinski in the Vermont Progressive Party primary, despite only being recognized as a write-in candidate. Zuckerman was endorsed by U.S. Senator from Vermont Bernie Sanders, the most popular senator amongst his constituents in the country. Zuckerman chose to run under the Progressive Party ballot line in the general election, listing the Democratic Party as a secondary nomination, utilizing Vermont's electoral fusion system. Despite Vermont being one of the most heavily Democratic states in the nation with a partisan voting index of D+15, Scott won reelection in a landslide because of his widespread popularity and focus on local issues. Scott has also been praised for his handling of the COVID-19 pandemic. Zuckerman had also made past comments perceived as being anti-vaccination.

Washington

Two-term incumbent Democrat Jay Inslee was eligible to run for re-election in 2020, as Washington does not have gubernatorial term limits. Inslee ran for re-election to a third term after dropping out of the Democratic presidential primaries on August 21, 2019. He faced police chief of the city of Republic, Washington, Loren Culp. A top-two, jungle primary took place on August 4, meaning that all candidates appeared on the same ballot regardless of party affiliation and the top two (Inslee and Culp) advanced to the general election in November. Washington is one of two states in the country, alongside California and Louisiana (and Nebraska for statewide offices), that holds jungle primaries rather than conventional ones. Inslee won both the primary and general elections in a landslide, becoming the first governor of Washington in decades to be elected to a third term. Culp refused to concede, citing false claims of election fraud.

West Virginia

One-term incumbent Republican Jim Justice ran for re-election in 2020. Justice was elected as a Democrat, but later switched to the Republican Party, making him the first Republican governor since Cecil H. Underwood, elected from 1997 until 2001. Justice faced centrist Democrat Ben Salango, who was endorsed by U.S. Senator Joe Manchin. Primaries were held on June 9, with Justice defeating former West Virginia Secretary of Commerce Woody Thrasher and former member of the West Virginia House of Delegates from the 63rd district, Mike Folk, by a large margin. Meanwhile, Salango won by a slim margin in a hotly contested Democratic primary between Salango and community organizer Stephen Smith, businessman Jody Murphy, and Douglas Hughes.

Attorney General Patrick Morrisey, retired Olympic gymnast Mary Lou Retton, and Secretary of State Mac Warner were mentioned as potential general election challengers, prior to Justice's decision to re-join the Republican Party.

Justice won reelection in a landslide.

Territories

American Samoa

Two-term incumbent Governor Lolo Letalu Matalasi Moliga was term-limited in 2020. Running to replace him were Lieutenant Governor Lemanu Palepoi Sialega Mauga, American Samoa Senate President Gaoteote Palaie Tofau, territorial Senator Nua Sao, and executive director of the American Samoa Government Employees' Retirement Fund Iaulualo Faafetai Talia.  Although individuals can and do affiliate with political parties, elections are held on a non-partisan basis with candidates running without party labels and no party primaries. The governor and lieutenant governor are elected on a shared ticket. The Mauga–Ale ticket won the election with more than 60% of the vote.

Puerto Rico

Incumbent governor Wanda Vázquez Garced of the New Progressive Party and the Republican Party, who became governor after Pedro Pierluisi's succession of Ricardo Rosselló was declared unconstitutional, was defeated in the New Progressive primary by Pierluisi in her bid to win a full term. He faced Isabela mayor Carlos Delgado Altieri, who won the Popular Democratic Party primary, as well as Senator Juan Dalmau of the Puerto Rican Independence Party, Alexandra Lúgaro of Movimiento Victoria Ciudadana, César Vázquez of Proyecto Dignidad, and independent candidate Eliezer Molina. Pierluisi won the election by a very slim margin.

See also
2020 United States presidential election
2020 United States House of Representatives elections
2020 United States Senate elections

Notes

References

 
November 2020 events in the United States